Mangollu is a village in Krishna district of the Indian state of Andhra Pradesh. It is located in Vatsavai mandal of Vijayawada revenue division.

See also 
List of villages in Krishna district

References

Villages in Krishna district